Taxes in Switzerland are levied by the Swiss Confederation, the cantons and the municipalities.

Legal framework

Fiscal sovereignty
Switzerland is a federal republic in which the sovereignty of the constituent states (the cantons) is limited by the enumerated powers delegated to the federal state (the Confederation) through the federal constitution. Consequently, the original authority to levy taxes is vested in the individual cantons of Switzerland through their constitutions. Within the bounds of the authority delegated to them by cantonal law, the municipalities may also levy taxes. The extent of that authority varies from canton to canton. While the formal framework of the most important cantonal direct taxes has been harmonised through the 1990 Federal Tax Harmonisation Law, the cantons (and, as the case may be, the municipalities) remain free to set their tax rates or establish new taxes, except on tax objects already taxed under federal law.

Since World War II, the federal constitution authorizes the Confederation to levy a number of taxes, the most significant of which are an income tax, a withholding tax and a value added tax. However, Switzerland is unique among modern sovereign states in that the authority to levy these taxes is limited in duration and extent. The Constitution imposes an upper limit on the federal tax rates and causes the federal authority to levy taxes to expire in 2020. A renewal of that authority requires a constitutional amendment, which must be approved in a popular referendum by both a majority of the popular vote and the cantons. If that renewal is not approved at the polls (as it has been six times since 1958), the Confederation itself will conceivably dissolve for lack of funds. All attempts to remove this limitation by amending the constitution to provide for a permanent federal authority to levy taxes have been rejected in Parliament or – no less than five times – by popular vote, most recently in 1991.

Constitutional limits to taxation
The federal constitution imposes certain limits on taxation at the federal, cantonal and municipal levels. To begin with, it provides that no tax may be levied except where provided for by federal, cantonal or municipal statute. Because statutes can at all levels be made subject to a popular referendum, Swiss tax rates are in practice set directly by the voters through instruments of direct democracy.

The constitution mandates that taxation must be general and equal in nature, and it must be proportionate to one's ability to pay. The Federal Supreme Court has interpreted this as prohibiting a regressive tax, although flat rate taxes (as instituted in several cantons) are held to be constitutional by tax law scholars. Moreover, double taxation by several cantons is constitutionally prohibited, as is a confiscatory rate of taxation.

Direct taxes on natural persons
All people resident in Switzerland are liable for the taxation of their worldwide income and assets, except on the income and wealth from foreign business or real estate, or where tax treaties limit double taxation. For tax purposes, residence may also arise if a person stays in Switzerland for 30 days, or for 90 days if he or she does not work. Moreover, non-residents are also taxed on certain Swiss assets or on the income from certain Swiss sources, such as from real estate, permanent business establishments or pensions. The income and assets of spouses are pooled and taxed jointly, but at a lower rate to offset the effects of tax progression.

Income tax
Either a progressive or proportional income tax is levied by the Confederation and by the cantons on the income of natural persons. The income tax is imposed as a payroll tax on foreign workers without a permanent residence (C) permit, and in the form of a withholding tax on certain transient persons, such as foreign musicians performing in Switzerland.

Taxable income includes all funds accruing to a person from all sources, in principle without deduction of losses or expenses, and including the rental value of a house lived in by its owner. However, capital gains on private property (such as profits from the sale of shares) are tax-free, except where the cantons levy a tax on real estate capital gains. Certain expenses are also deductible. These include social security or pension fund payments, expenses related to the gain of income (such as employment expenses and maintenance costs of real estate) and alimonies. Gifts and inheritances are also exempt from the income tax, but are subject to separate cantonal taxes.

Non-working foreigners resident in Switzerland may choose to pay a lump-sum tax instead of the normal income tax. The tax, which is generally much lower than the normal income tax, is nominally levied on the taxpayer's living expenses, but in practice (which varies from canton to canton), it is common to use the quintuple of the rent paid by the taxpayer as a basis for the lump-sum taxation. This option contributes to Switzerland's status as a tax haven, and has induced many wealthy foreigners to live in Switzerland.

In 2011, the federal income tax varied from a bracket of 1% (for single tax payers) and 0.77% (for married taxpayers) to the maximum rate of 11.5%. Individuals earning below 13,600 and couples earning below 27,000 Swiss francs were exempt. On cantonal level, tax rates varies heavily, Obwalden adapted a 1.8% flat tax on all personal income following a cantonal referendum in 2007. In most cantons, the rate is proportional with a maximum rate of 6.5% in Bern, whereas in Zurich it was 13% and in Geneva 17.58-.76% (depending upon taxes as single or jointly).

Wealth tax
A proportional wealth tax of around 0.3 to 0.5 percent is levied by the cantons on the net worth of natural persons. The tax is levied on the value of all assets (such as real estate, shares or funds) after the deduction of any debts.

Taxes by canton

Corporate taxation

Switzerland has a "classical" corporate tax system in which a corporation and its owners or shareholders are taxed individually, causing economic double taxation. All legal persons are subject to the taxation of their profit and capital, with the exception of charitable organisations. Tax liability arises if either the legal seat or the effective management of a corporation is in Switzerland. To the extent non-resident companies have Swiss sources of income, such as business establishments or real estate, they are also liable for taxation. Conversely, as a unilateral measure to limit double taxation, profits from foreign business establishments or real estate are exempted from taxation.

Profit tax
A proportional or progressive tax is levied by the Confederation (at a flat rate of 8.5%) and the cantons (at varying rates) on corporate profits. The tax is based on the net profit as accounted for in the corporate income statement, as adjusted for tax purposes. For instance, expenditures that have no business reason such as excessive depreciations, accruals or reserves, as well as disguised dividends are taxed as profits.

A number of provisions limit the double taxation of profits at the corporate level and contribute to Switzerland's tax haven status. To begin with, a "participation exemption" is granted to companies who hold 20 percent or more of the shares of other companies; the amount of tax due on the corresponding profit is reduced in proportion to the percentage of shares held. At the cantonal level only, a "holding privilege" applies to pure holding companies. They are exempt from the cantonal corporate profit tax. Moreover, cantonal law confers a "domicile privilege" on companies who are only administered in Switzerland, but whose business is conducted abroad; including shell corporations. The cantons tax only around 10 percent of the worldwide profits of such companies.

Capital tax
A proportional tax is levied by the cantons (at varying rates) on the Eigenkapital (ownership equity) of companies. Thinly capitalised companies are taxed, moreover, on the liabilities that function as equity. This also means that debts paid on such liabilities cannot be deducted for purposes of the profit tax, and are subject to the federal withholding tax.

Furthemore, many Cantons levy minimum taxes on capital or a generall minimum tax, which means that small companies and non-profitable companies have to pay more taxes percentagewise than larger companies. Cantonal legislator try this way to cover the cost associated with auditing these small companies.

Other federal taxes

Value added tax
The value added tax (VAT; Mehrwertsteuer / Taxe sur la valeur ajoutée / Imposta sul valore aggiunto) is one of the Confederation's principal sources of funding. It is levied at a rate of 7.7 percent on most commercial exchanges of goods and services. Certain exchanges are subject to a reduced VAT of 2.5 percent:

Foodstuffs (except alcoholic beverages)
Cattle, poultry, fish
Seeds, living plants, cut flowers
Grains
Animal feed and fertilizer
Medications
Newspapers, magazines, books and other printed products without advertising character of the kinds to be stipulated by the Federal Council
Services of radio and television companies (exception: the normal rate applies for services of a commercial nature)

A special rate of 3.7% is in use in the hotel industry. Yet other exchanges, including those of medical, educational and cultural services, are tax-exempt; as are goods delivered and services provided abroad. The party providing the service or delivering the goods is liable for the payment of the VAT, but the tax is usually passed on to the customer as part of the price.

In 2014 total revenue from VAT was nearly CHF 11 billion (short scale) on CHF 866 billion of taxable sales. In 2013 the revenue and sales were CHF 10.3 billion and 858 billion respectively.

Federal withholding tax
The federal withholding tax (Verrechnungssteuer / impôt anticipé / Imposta preventiva) is levied on certain forms of income, most notably dividend payments, interest on bank loans and bonds, liquidation proceeds, lottery winnings and payments by life insurances and private pension funds. The debtor of such payments is liable for the payment of the tax; they must pay the creditor only the net amount. The tax rate is 35% for moveable capital revenue and for lottery winnings of 1 million francs or more, 15% for life annuities and pensions and 8% for other insurance benefits.

With respect to creditors resident in Switzerland, the withholding tax is only a means of securing the payment of the income or profit tax, from which the creditor may then deduct the amount already withheld, or request its refund. The same applies to foreign creditors to the extent that a tax treaty provides for it. Other foreign creditors are not eligible for a refund; with respect to them, the withholding tax is a genuine tax.

Stamp duties
Stamp duties are a group of federal taxes levied on certain commercial transactions. The name is an anachronism and dates back to the time when such taxes were administered with physical stamps. The issue tax (Emissionssteuer / Tassa di emissione) is levied on the issue of certain securities such as shares and bonds. Exceptions are made, inter alia, for securities issued in the course of a commercial reorganization, and the first million CHF of funds raised are in effect exempt from taxation. The tax amounts to one percent of the funds raised and is payable by the issuer.  The trade in shell companies (Mantelhandel) is also subject to the issue tax.

The transfer tax (Umsatzsteuer / Imposta sulla cifra d'affari) is levied on the trade in certain securities by certain qualified traders (Effektenhändler; mostly stockbrokers and large holding companies). The tax amounts to 0.15 or 0.3 percent depending on whether Swiss or foreign securities are traded. Finally, an insurance premiums tax of 5 or 2.5 percent is levied on certain insurance premiums.

Custom duties
The Confederation can levy customs duties and other duties on the cross-border movement of goods entering the Swiss Customs Area. The rates are almost exclusively based on weight (e.g. CHF X per 100 kg gross). The revenue from customs duties goes into the federal coffers and amounted to approximately CHF 1.13 billion in 2016.

Casino tax
After the removal of the casino ban from the Constitution in 1993, the Confederation received the power to collect a special tax on the revenue of casinos. The tax may not exceed 80% of the gross gaming revenue and is assigned to the AHV/IV fund.

Tax scales
Grand casinos holding a type A concession: unlimited bets, unrestricted number of table games and slot machines. Currently, 8 Grand casinos are in operation. The basic tax rate is 40 percent for the first CHF 10 million of gross gaming revenue. For each additional million, the tax rate is increased by 0.5 percent until it reaches the maximum rate of 80 percent.

Casinos holding a type B concession: limited bets, limited selection of table games and limited number of slot machines. Currently, 13 casinos are in operation. The basic tax rate is 40 percent for the first CHF 10 million of gross gaming revenue. For each additional million, the tax rate is increased by 0.5 percent until it reaches the maximum rate of 80 percent.

Special consumption taxes
The Confederation levies special consumption taxes on the importation or manufacture of tobacco, beer, mineral oil, automobiles and spirits.

Military service exemption tax
Every Swiss man is required to perform military service (Art. 59 para. 1 Cst). Anyone who, for whatever reason, fails (in whole or in part) to fulfil this duty personally by doing military or civilian service has to pay military service exemption tax.

The exemption tax amounts to CHF 3 per CHF 100 of income liable to tax, but no less than CHF 400. However, it is reduced according to the total number of service days performed by the end of the relevant year. The reduction is one tenth for 50 to 99 military service days (75 to 149 civilian service days), plus another tenth for each set of 50 additional military service days (75 civilian service days) or fractions thereof.

The exemption tax assessment is carried out annually, generally in the year following the relevant year. Only those who have performed the total number of mandatory service days are entitled to a refund of the exemption tax(es) paid. The revenue from military service exemption tax amounted to approximately CHF 174 million in 2016.

Other cantonal taxes
In addition to the taxes mentioned above, the cantons are free to introduce others. Several cantons levy an inheritance tax (Erbschaftssteuer / Imposta di successione) and a gift tax (Schenkungssteuer / Imposta di donazione), although there is a trend towards abolishing those. Moreover, the cantons are required by federal law to levy a tax on the profit from the sale of real estate (Grundstückgewinnsteuer / impôt sur les gains immobiliers / Imposta sugli utili immobiliari). Most also levy a tax on the value of the property sold (Handänderungssteuer / impôt sur les mutations / Tassa di mutazione) so as to discourage speculation in real estate. Taxes are also frequently levied on the ownership of dogs and motor vehicles, on lotteries, on the sale of tickets to public entertainments, or on overnight stays in certain tourist destinations.

Casino tax
All cantons with casinos holding a type B concession amended their tax legislation and introduced a tax on gross gaming revenue of casinos. The tax may not  amount to more than 40 percent of the total casino tax due to the Confederation.

Tax rates and statistics

In 2016, some CHF 183 billion in taxes were levied in Switzerland, of which 65.5 billion was levied by the Confederation, 46 billion by the cantons, 28 billion by the municipalities and 45 billion in form of social security contributions. The overall fiscal rate was 27.8 percent of GDP in 2016. The effective individual tax rate is subject to considerable variation depending on the canton and municipality of residence. For instance, companies subject to ordinary taxation paid between 13 and 25 percent of income tax in 2006, and the maximum individual tax rates in major cities ranged between 12.3 percent in the Canton of Zug and 32.3 percent in the Canton of Jura.

Tax evasion

Depending on the nature of the tax at issue, criminal offences related to the nonpayment of taxes are regulated in substantially different ways by cantonal and federal statutes. The statutes distinguish, however, between tax evasion and tax fraud. The former is classed as a misdemeanour (Übertretung / contravention) and is punishable by a fine of 33% to 300% of the amount of tax evaded. Tax fraud occurs if a tax evasion is committed by using falsified documents for deceptive purposes, a crime (Vergehen / crime) punishable by additional imprisonment of up to three years or an additional fine of up to 30,000 CHF.

See also
Social security in Switzerland

Notes and references

Bibliography

External links
Swiss Federal Tax Administration
Swiss research on fiscal federalism
Swiss tax calculator